Squires is a surname. Notable people with the surname include:

 Bruce Squires (1910-1981), American swing jazz trombonist
 Carolyn Squires (1940-2016), American politician
 Catherine Squires (1941-2021), American scientist
 Dorothy Squires (1915-1998), Welsh vocalist
 Dougie Squires (born 1932), English choreographer
 Frank Squires, Welsh footballer
 Frank C. Squires, American architect
 Frederick C. Squires (1881-1960), Canadian lawyer
 Geoffrey Squires (born 1942), Irish poet
 Gerald Squires (born 1937), Canadian painter
 Greg Squires (born 1988), American ice hockey player
 Helena Squires (1879-1959), Canadian politician
 Hilary Squires (born 1933), retired South African judge and barrister
 Jamie Squires (born 1975), English footballer
 John C. Squires (1925-1944), United States Army soldier
 Mike Squires (born 1952), American baseball player
 Peter Squires (sportsman) (born 1951), English rugby union footballer
 Peter J. M. Squires, senior Royal Air Force officer 
 Raymond Squires (1926–2019), Canadian businessman
 Richard Squires (1880-1940), Prime Minister of Newfoundland
 Robert Squires (1927–2016), British Royal Navy officer
 Ron Squires (1952-1993), United States politician in Vermont
 Roger Squires (born 1932), British crossword compiler
 Stan Squires (1909-1950), English cricketer
 Tony Squires (born 1961), Australian media personality

See also
 Squire (name)

English-language surnames
Surnames of Norman origin
Patronymic surnames